Plagiorhynchidae is a family of parasitic Acanthocephalan worms.

Species
Genera in Plagiorhynchidae are divided into three subfamilies: Plagiorhynchinae, Porrorchinae, and Sphaerechinorhynchinae.

Plagiorhynchinae Meyer, 1931
Paralueheia Saxena & Gupta, 2008
Paralueheia guptai Saxena & Gupta, 2008

Species in Plagiorhynchus are divided into two subgenera: Plagiorhynchus and Prosthorhynchus.

Plagiorhynchus Lühe, 1911
 Plagiorhynchus allisonae Smales, 2002
 Plagiorhynchus aznari

P. aznari was found infesting a long-billed curlew (Numenius americanus) from northern Mexico.

 Plagiorhynchus charadrii Yamaguti, 1939)
 Plagiorhynchus charadriicola Dollfus, 1953)
 Plagiorhynchus crassicollis Villot, 1875)
 Plagiorhynchus freitasi Vicente, 1977
 Plagiorhynchus karachiensis Muti-ur-Rahman, Khan, Khatoon and Bilqees, 2008
 Plagiorhynchus lemnisalis Belopolskaya, 1958
 Plagiorhynchus linearis Westrumb, 1821)
 Plagiorhynchus menurae Johnston, 1912)
 Plagiorhynchus odhneri Lundström, 1942
 Plagiorhynchus paulus Van Cleave and Williams, 1950
 Plagiorhynchus pigmentatus de Marval, 1902)
 Plagiorhynchus ponticus Lisitsyna, 1992
 Plagiorhynchus rectus Linton, 1892)
 Plagiorhynchus rosai Porta, 1910)
 Plagiorhynchus rostratus de Marval, 1902)
 Plagiorhynchus totani Porta, 1910)
 Plagiorhynchus urichi Cameron, 1936)

Prosthorhynchus Kostylew, 1915
 Plagiorhynchus angrensis Travassos, 1926)
 Plagiorhynchus asturi Gupta and Lata, 1967)
 Plagiorhynchus asymmetricus Belopolskaya, 1983)
 Plagiorhynchus bullocki Schmidt and Kuntz, 1966
 Plagiorhynchus cossyphicola Smales, 2010
 Plagiorhynchus cylindraceus Goeze, 1782)

P. cylindraceus was found infesting the Austral thrush (Turdus falcklandii) in central Chile. Janice Moore discovered P. cylindraceus to be a parasite that infects an intermediate host, the terrestrial isopod Armadillidium vulgare, which alters its behavior and becomes more susceptible to P. cylindraceus''' primary host, the European starling (Sturnus vulgaris).

 Plagiorhynchus deysarkari Bhattacharya, 2002
 Plagiorhynchus digiticephalus Amin, Ha and Heckmann, 2008
 Plagiorhynchus gallinagi Schachtachtinskaja, 1953)
 Plagiorhynchus genitopapillatus Lundström, 1942)
 Plagiorhynchus golvani Schmidt and Kuntz, 1966
 Plagiorhynchus gracilis Petrochenko, 1958)
 Plagiorhynchus kuntzi Gupta and Fatma, 1988
 Plagiorhynchus limnobaeni Tubangui, 1933)
 Plagiorhynchus longirostris Travassos, 1926)
 Plagiorhynchus luehei Travassos, 1916)
 Plagiorhynchus malayensis Tubangui, 1935)
 Plagiorhynchus megareceptaclis Amin, Ha and Heckmann, 2008
 Plagiorhynchus nicobarensis Soota and Kansal, 1970)
 Plagiorhynchus ogatai Fukui and Morisita, 1936)
 Plagiorhynchus pittarum Tubangui, 1935)
 Plagiorhynchus reticulatus Westrumb, 1821)
 Plagiorhynchus rheae de Marval, 1902)
 Plagiorhynchus rossicus Kostylew, 1915)
 Plagiorhynchus russelli Tadros, 1970
 Plagiorhynchus schmidti Golvan, 1994)
 Plagiorhynchus scolopacidis Kostylew, 1915)
 Plagiorhynchus transversus Rudolphi, 1819)
 Plagiorhynchus varispinus Wang, 1966)

Porrorchinae Golvan, 1956Lueheia Travassos, 1919Lueheia adlueheia (Werby, 1938) Lueheia cajabambensis Machado-Filho and Ibanez, 1967Lueheia inscripta (Westrumb, 1821)L. inscripta was found infesting the Austral thrush (Turdus falcklandii) in central Chile. It has also been found in the Puerto Rican lizard Anolis cristatellus.Lueheia karachiensis Khan, Bilqees and Muti-ur-Rahman, 2005 Lueheia lueheia Travassos, 1919Oligoterorhynchus Monticelli, 1914Oligoterorhynchus campylurus (Nitzsch, 1857)Owilfordia Schmidt and Kuntz, 1967Owilfordia olseni Schmidt and Kuntz, 1967Owilfordia schmidti Gupta and Fatma, 1988Owilfordia teliger (Van Cleave, 1949)Porrorchis Fukui, 1929Porrorchis aruensis Smales, 2010Porrorchis bazae (Southwell and Macfie, 1925)Porrorchis brevicanthus (Das, 1949)Porrorchis centropi (Porta, 1910)Porrorchis centropusi (Tubangui, 1933)Porrorchis chauhani Gupta and Fatma, 1986Porrorchis crocidurai Gupta and Fatma, 1986Porrorchis elongatus Fukui, 1929Porrorchis heckmanni Bilqees, Khan, Khatoon and Khatoon, 2007Porrorchis herpistis Bhattacharya, 2007Porrorchis houdemeri (Joyeux and Baer, 1935)Porrorchis hydromuris (Edmonds, 1957)Porrorchis hylae (Johnston, 1914)Porrorchis indicus (Das, 1957)Porrorchis jonesae Muti-ur-Rahman, Khan, Khatoon and Bilqees, 2010Porrorchis keralensis George and Nadakal, 1984Porrorchis kinsellai Lisitsyna, Tkach and Bush, 2012Porrorchis leibyi Schmidt and Kuntz, 1967Porrorchis maxvachoni (Golvan and Brygoo, 1965)Porrorchis nickoli Salgado-Maldonado and Cruz-Reyes, 2002Porrorchis oti Yamaguti, 1939Porrorchis rotundatus (von Linstow, 1897)Porrorchis tyto Amin, Ha and Heckmann, 2008Pseudogordiorhynchus Golvan, 1957Pseudogordiorhynchus antonmeyeri Golvan, 1957Pseudolueheia Schmidt and Kuntz, 1967Pseudolueheia arunachalensis Bhattacharya, 2007Pseudolueheia boreotis (Van Cleave and Williams, 1951)Pseudolueheia korathai Gupta and Fatma, 1988Pseudolueheia pittae Schmidt and Kuntz, 1967Pseudolueheia tongsoni Salcedo and Celis, 2007

Sphaerechinorhynchinae Golvan, 1956Sphaerechinorhynchus Johnston, 1929Sphaerechinorhynchus macropisthospinus Amin, Wongsawad, Marayong, Saehoong, Suwattanacoupt and Say, 1998S. macropisthospinus has been found in the intestine of the tiger (Panthera tigris) and a water monitor (Varanus salvator) in Vietnam.Sphaerechinorhynchus maximesospinus Amin, Ha and Heckmann, 2008Sphaerechinorhynchus ophiograndis Bolette, 1997Sphaerechinorhynchus rotundocapitatus (Johnston, 1912)Sphaerechinorhynchus serpenticola Schmidt and Kuntz, 1966
HostsPlagiorhynchidae'' species parasitize a variety of hosts.

Notes

References

 
Polymorphida
Acanthocephala families